The canton of Celles-sur-Belle is an administrative division of the Deux-Sèvres department, western France. Its borders were modified at the French canton reorganisation which came into effect in March 2015. Its seat is in Celles-sur-Belle.

It consists of the following communes:
 
Aigondigné
Avon
Beaussais-Vitré
Bougon
Celles-sur-Belle
Chenay
Chey
Exoudun
Fressines
Lezay
Messé
La Mothe-Saint-Héray
Pamproux
Prailles-La Couarde
Rom
Saint-Coutant
Sainte-Soline
Salles
Sepvret
Soudan
Vançais
Vanzay

References

Cantons of Deux-Sèvres